A Blonde Woman, also called Flora, is an oil painting by Palma Vecchio, dated today to around 1520, but undocumented before 1870, in the collection of the National Gallery, London. This half-length depiction of a woman in loosened white chemise with a dark green mantle, holding some flowers, has been interpreted as an idealised representation of female beauty (sometimes in connection with the Roman goddess Flora), and as an actual portrait of either a gentlewoman or a courtesan.

Description
The picture was painted in oils on a wood panel measuring 77.5 cm by 64.1 cm (2 ft 6½ in by 2 ft 3¾ in); a strip 2.54 cm (1 in) high has been added along the top of the panel, lengthening it. It is in very good condition, with most of the repainting concentrated in the side of the face and hair which is cast in shadow.

The subject is a young woman with fair skin and blonde carefully tended silken hair sweeping about her shoulders, who shows much décolletée; her white chemise or camicia is unfastened and slipping off her shoulder, baring her right breast and nipple, and there is a little piece of narrow blue ribbon, designed to fasten the chemise. In her right hand is a small bunch of colourful spring flowers.

Date
By comparing Palma's treatment of the subject's coiffure with similar styles in pictures by contemporary Venetian artists, such as Lorenzo Lotto, the picture has been dated to about 1520. Jean Paul Richter, writing in 1910, thought the picture representative of Palma's work during the previous decade, from 1510 to 1520, and allied in composition with the "beautiful series of portraits" now preserved in the Gallery of Vienna. The work has been compared to Palma's Sibyl, which is also dated to the 1520s. In Venus and Cupid in a Landscape, another work by Palma, dated by the Fitzwilliam Museum, where it hangs, to about 1523 or 1524, Venus has the same dimpled chin, and other facial features, as the subject of this painting.

Analysis
Palma Vecchio is known mainly for religious scenes and portraits of women, and, according to Cecil Gould, this example of the latter group is characteristic of his style. The subject is a young woman of that "opulent voluptuous type", in Richter's phrase, which was much admired in Venice at the beginning of the sixteenth century, and was represented in works by Titian, Palma, Lorenzo Lotto, Bonifazio Veronese, Paris Bordone, and others. The character of these works is disputed, as to whether the women represented are simply ideals of female beauty created by the artist, or portraits of actually existing beauties, and, if portraits, of whom.

In the National Gallery catalogues, this picture was for many years titled Flora after the ancient Roman goddess of spring and flowers. Certain particularities of the composition, such as the posy of forget-me-nots, buttercups (or wall-flowers) and primroses held in the subject's right hand, and the erotic suggestion of the loosened chemise, have drawn comparison with Titian's earlier painting of the same name. Richter, who titles the work Portrait of a Lady, writes of the "cold whiteness" of the chemise which has fallen away from the shoulders, "like the discarded sheath of an opening flower". Gould thinks the influence of Titian likely, though unprovable given the dearth of primary sources for the picture. 

The identity of the sitter is unknown, and according to Gould impossible to determine given the "summary treatment of the features". Richter, conversely, describes Palma's "carefully individualised heads" of women as portraits. Palma painted a number of similar half-lengths of (real or ideal) beauties, and the type became one of his specialities. Such eroticised images were not intended for public exhibition, but to be hung in private apartments, and were commissioned by a clientele of wealthy male collectors. There is also evidence that some successful courtesans and mistresses bought and owned alluring portraits of themselves to advertise their charms. Portraits of such well-known women were ordered by their lovers and admirers, who were sometimes even pictured with them. Claude Phillips writes of "the exquisite, golden blond courtezans—or, if you will, models—who constantly appear and reappear in this period of Venetian art". The connection extends to the name Flora, which was a common alias of prostitutes in Italy from Roman times. This painting has therefore been interpreted as "probably a portrait of a Venetian courtesan". According to Richter, however, although Palma's pictures of women may sometimes depict courtesans, they may equally often be portraits of great ladies, gentlewomen, and brides, whose husbands were simply proud of their beauty.

Provenance
Palma never signed or dated any of his canvases, and although this one is to-day attributed to him based on the style and handling of the composition, the documentation of the picture is completely lacking before 1870. On 30 April 1870 it was auctioned by Christie's as lot 53 of the William Delafield sale, with an attribution to Paris Bordone. The picture was bought from a Dr. Becci in Florence, who had acquired it some time before in England, and was firmly convinced that it was by Leonardo da Vinci. It had previously belonged to a Mr. Delafield. It was acquired by Ludwig Mond in 1889, who, just before his death 1909, bequeathed it, along with the most of his collection of Old Master pictures, to the National Gallery, pending the death of his widow, Frida Mond, who lived until 1923. In 1924, after settling a legal dispute with the family, the National Gallery acquired the picture (accession number NG3939) through the Mond bequest.

Three copies or versions of the composition have between recorded:

 Formerly in the collection of the Duke of Northumberland at Syon House, auctioned by Sotheby's on 26 March 1952 as lot 109.
 From an anonymous sale, auctioned by Sotheby's on 12 December 1954 as lot 62.
 Sold at Cologne in 1904. The sitter is described as wearing pearls.

Allusions 
 In his 1969 novel Ada or Ardor: A Family Chronicle, Vladimir Nabokov refers to this picture ("a Venetian blonde") and the painter ("a drunken Palma Vecchio").

Related works

Notes

References

Sources
 Gould, Cecil (1975; repr. 1987). The Sixteenth-Century Italian Schools. National Gallery Catalogues. London: William Clowes Ltd. pp. 184–185, 187–188.
 Held, Julius S. (1961). "17. Flora: Goddess and Courtesan". In Meiss, Millard (ed.). Essays in Honor of Erwin Panofsky. Vol. 1. New York: New York University Press. pp. 201–218
 Humfrey, Peter (1995). Painting in Renaissance Venice. New Haven and London: Yale University Press. pp. 162–168.
 Jones, Jonathan (4 April 2012). "Flora in the flesh: Palma Vecchio's A Blonde Woman". The Guardian (online ed.). Retrieved 16 January 2023.
 Kren, Thomas; Burke, Jill; Campbell, Stephen J., eds. (2018). The Renaissance Nude. J. Paul Getty Museum. pp. 346–347, pl. 106.
 Nabokov, Vladimir (1969). Ada or Ardor: A Family Chronicle. New York: McGraw Hill International, Inc. p. 141. (Ada Online).
 Phillips, Claude (1897). The Earlier Work of Titian. London: Seeley & Co., Limited; New York: The Macmillan Company. pp. 18, 52.
 Philipps, Adolf (February 1905). "Die Kunst der Renaissance in Italien" (Abridged from the German). In Masters in Art, Vol. 6, Part 62 (Palma Vecchio). Boston: Bates & Guild Co. pp. 26–27.
 Richter, Jean Paul (1910). The Mond Collection, an Appreciation. Vol. 1. London: John Murray. pp. 129–136, plate viii.
 Santore, Cathy (2008). "Like a Nymph". Source: Notes in the History of Art, 27(4): pp. 20–21.
 Shapiro, Gavriel (2014). The Tender Friendship and the Charm of Perfect Accord: Nabokov and His Father. Ann Arbor: University of Michigan Press. p. 156.
 Spahn, A. (1932). Palma Vecchio. Leipzig: Karl W. Hiersemann. p. 126.
 Wardleworth, Dennis (2003). "The "friendly" battle for the Mond Bequest". The British Art Journal, 4(3): pp. 87–93.
 "Palma Vecchio | A Blonde Woman | NG3939". National Gallery. Retrieved 28 November 2022.
 "RCIN 405763 – A Sibyl". Royal Collection Trust. Retrieved 14 January 2023.
 "Venus and Cupid: 109". The Fitzwilliam Museum. Retrieved 17 January 2023.

Further reading

 Collier-Frick, Carole (1987). "Dal giardino dei bei fiori" (Translated from the Italian). Carte Italiane, 1(8): pp. 37–52.
 Fruehling, Sarah Elizabeth (December 2004). "Some social considerations in the female portraits of Palma Vecchio" (Thesis). University of Louisville. pp. 42, 69.
 Lawner, Lynne (1987). Lives of the Courtesans: Portraits of the Renaissance. New York: Rizzoli.
 Ovadia, Eynav (August 2019). "Flowering in the Springtime: An Iconographical Analysis of Botticelli’s Primavera" (Thesis). Lindenwood University. pp. 17, 56, pl. 4.
 Rylands, Philip (1992). Palma Vecchio. (Cambridge Studies in the History of Art). Cambridge: Cambridge University Press.
 Catalogue of Fine Pictures by Masters of the English School and Old Masters (Sotheby & Co.) London: Kitchen & Barratt Ltd., 1934. p. 13.

External links
 Hanley, Lynn (13 May 2021). "Flora the ambitious blonde". Beyond the Palette. Retrieved 20 February 2023.
 Shafe, Laurence (n.d.). "The Renaissance Nude". Shafe. pp. 47–48. Retrieved 20 February 2023.
 "Acquisition: Mond Bequest (1907–1999)". National Gallery. Retrieved 14 January 2023.
 "Master Paintings & Sculpture Evening Sale / Lot 20". Sotheby's. 2017. Retrieved 28 January 2023.
 "Palma Vecchio". Cavallini to Veronese. Retrieved 13 January 2023.
 "RCIN 2081366 – 'Female figure' 1857". Royal Collection Trust. Retrieved 17 January 2023.
 

1520s paintings
Paintings by Palma Vecchio
Nude art
Prostitution in paintings
Collections of the National Gallery, London